Let's Talk About Pep is an American reality television series that aired for one season from January 11 until March 1, 2010.

Premise

Cast
Sandra "Pep" Denton
Joumana Kidd
Jacque Reid
Kali Troy

Episodes

References

External links
 
TV Guide
 

2010 American television series debuts
2010 American television series endings
2010s American reality television series
English-language television shows
Television shows set in New York City
VH1 original programming